"Easy to Please" is a song written by Kent Robbins and Kye Fleming, and recorded by American country music artist Janie Fricke.  It was released in February 1986 as the third single from the album Somebody Else's Fire.  The song reached #5 on the Billboard Hot Country Singles & Tracks chart.

Chart performance

References

1986 singles
1985 songs
Janie Fricke songs
Songs written by Kye Fleming
Songs written by Kent Robbins
Song recordings produced by Bob Montgomery (songwriter)
Columbia Records singles